Brandval is a village in Kongsvinger Municipality in Innlandet county, Norway. The Norwegian National Road 2 and the Solørbanen railway line both run through the village. Brandval Church is located in the village.

The village has a sawmill and some businesses involving wood products and logging.

This village was the administrative centre of the old municipality of Brandval that existed from 1866 until its dissolution in 1964.

References

Kongsvinger
Villages in Innlandet
Populated places on the Glomma River